Quitman is a city and the county seat of Wood County, Texas, United States. Its population was 1,942 at the 2020 census. It is most notable for being the birthplace of Academy Award-winning actress Sissy Spacek.  The city was named for John A. Quitman, a veteran of the Mexican–American War, and once governor of Mississippi.

Geography

Climate
The climate in this area is characterized by hot, humid summers and generally mild to cool winters.  According to the Köppen climate classification, Quitman has a humid subtropical climate, Cfa on climate maps.

Government
Quitman operates under a mayor-council form of government in which the mayor is the head. The mayor, with advice from the council, hires a professional administrator who oversees the day-to-day operation of the city.  the mayor is Randy Dunn.

Demographics

As of the 2020 United States census, there were 1,942 people, 824 households, and 559 families residing in the city.

At the 2010 census, 1,809 people were in 775 households, including 509 families, in the city. The 874 housing units  averaged .

Of the 775 households, 28.1% had children under 18 living with them, 50.5% were married couples living together, 13.3% had a female householder with no husband present, and 34.2% were not families. About 32.0% of households were one person, and 23.6% were one person aged 65 or older. The average household size was 2.32, and the average family size was 2.91.

The age distribution was 22.1% under the age of 18, 6.0% from 18 to 24, 24.2% from 25 to 44, 18.8% from 45 to 64, and 29.0% 65 or older. The median age was 43 years. For every 100 females, there were 86.1 males. For every 100 females age 18 and over, there were 77.4 males.

Males had a median income of  versus  for females. About 9.2% of families and 11.3% of the population were below the poverty line, including 12.6% of those under age 18 and 12.8% of those age 65 or over.

Economy
Quitman serves as the home to many local businesses, most of which provide services to Wood County. BTH Bank, however, has spread its roots beyond county lines, and continues to grow throughout the East Texas area. Several locally owned restaurants provide a "mom and pop" service to the town.  Quitman is also the home to several co-operative businesses. Wood County Electric Co-operative, Inc. and Peoples Telephone Co-operative, Inc are both located in Quitman.

Culture
The Quitman Community Theatre, awarded by County Line magazine as the Best Small Town Community Theatre in the Upper Eastside of Texas for five consecutive years, has provided the town with live productions since 2001. Each production takes place at the Carroll Green Civic Center, and the theatre typically produces around three productions per year, including a musical. The 2017 Reaching Others Through Christ award went to Quitman to build wheelchair ramps for some of the families living in Quitman and the surrounding cities.

Education
The City of Quitman is served by the Quitman Independent School District, a University Interscholastic League (UIL) class-3A school district. Recently, the school has produced a state championship in golf, UIL news writing, and powerlifting, and received first runner-up at the 2011 state UIL one-act play contest.

Public Library
The Quitman Public Library is located at 202 East Goode Street, one block east of the Wood County Courthouse.  The library was formed in 1975 when a group of citizens gathered to study the need for a public library that would serve Quitman and the surrounding community. The Quitman City Council chartered the library in 1975. The library's first building was in a frame house offered by the Liles family located at the corner of Main and Lane Streets near the courthouse square.
	
In August 1980, a financial drive began to purchase a larger building to house the many books that had been collected from donations.  The community supported the drive, and the former facility of the First National Bank, at 202 East Goode Street, Quitman, was purchased.  In early 1987, a local fundraising effort was started for additional space in the library to accommodate a children's department, a staff book-processing area, and a community meeting room.  The library received several grants, and in October 1988, the Thurman Shamburger Wing was dedicated.

Today, the Quitman Public Library is fully staffed and houses a collection of nearly 30,000 items in a variety of formats; the library also houses the collection of the Wood County Genealogical Society. The library has an advisory board and active Friends of the Library group.

The mayor of Quitman and the Quitman city council are the governing body of the Quitman Public Library as it is a department of the city government.

Notable people

 Will Hogg, Houston attorney, philanthropist, and founder of River Oaks, Houston
 Bryan Hughes, American politician, Texas State Senator for District 1
 Thomas Morrow Reavley, senior judge of the United States Court of Appeals for the Fifth Circuit
 Sissy Spacek, prolific actress who won an Academy Award for her role as country star Loretta Lynn in the 1980 film Coal Miner's Daughter

Notes

References

External links

Quitman Public Library

Cities in Wood County, Texas
Cities in Texas
County seats in Texas
Populated places established in 1850
1850 establishments in Texas